Penicillium palitans is an anamorph species of fungus in the genus Penicillium which was isolated from cheese and ancient permafrost deposits. Penicillium palitans produces viridicatin, cyclopiazonic acid, roquefortine, palitantin and ochratoxin A

References

Further reading 
 
 
 

palitans
Fungi described in 1911